The Amazing Howard Hughes is a 1977 American made-for-television biographical film about American aviation pioneer and filmmaker Howard Hughes, based on the book Howard: The Amazing Mr. Hughes by Hughes' business partner Noah Dietrich. The film starred Tommy Lee Jones, Ed Flanders, and Tovah Feldshuh. The Amazing Howard Hughes recounts the life and times of Howard Hughes, and was made within a year of Hughes's death in April 1976. It was originally broadcast in two parts on CBS on April 13 and 14, 1977.

Plot
Howard Hughes (Tommy Lee Jones), from early life, is portrayed as an eccentric perfectionist and later, a hypochondriac. He grew up as a wealthy but isolated individual who was able to indulge some of his obsessions. As a Hollywood producer, he was able to create some of the most iconic films of the era, including Hell's Angels (1930), Scarface (1932) and The Outlaw (1943, 1946). His passion as an aviator led to both designing as the head of the Hughes Aircraft Company, as well as flying top-secret aircraft he had built in record-breaking speed and endurance flights (Hughes H-1 Racer).

As well as pouring money into films and projects such as the huge H-4 Hercules aircraft, Hughes is also seen with many of the women in his life, including Jean Harlow, Ginger Rogers, Katharine Hepburn (Tovah Feldshuh), and Jane Russell (Marla Carlis).

One incident in a 1946 involved a test flight of the XF-11, an experimental aircraft.  The test flight culminated in a horrific crash, resulting in a concussion that left Hughes with brain damage and mental dysfunction, going into his old age and eventual death. His final years were spent as a recluse and while aboard a private flight to Houston, Hughes died.

Cast

 Tommy Lee Jones as Howard Hughes
 Ed Flanders as Noah Dietrich
 Lee Purcell as Billie Dove
 Sorrell Booke as Mayor Fiorello LaGuardia
 James Hampton as Wilbur Peterson
 Howard Hesseman as Jenks
 Tovah Feldshuh as Katharine Hepburn
 Marla Carlis as Jane Russell
 Ed Harris as Russ

Production

Development
In 1971, Bob Thomas was contacted by director George Sidney, who had gotten to know the writer while the latter was researching  King Cohn, a biography of Harry Cohn. Sidney said Stanley Meyer, the financier, was looking for someone to help write Noah Dietrich's memoirs. Thomas met with Dietrich and wrote a book about Hughes. They struggled to find a publisher due to the fact Clifford Irving had released Hughes' diaries. When it was revealed the diaries were fake, the book found a publisher, Fawcett, the next day.

Fawcett released a million copies but only sold a third of them, which Thomas attributed to Irving's book. On the death of Hughes in 1976, numerous producers announced Hughes projects, including Warren Beatty and David Wolper, the latter based on Irving's book. Thomas' agents succeeded in selling the film rights to Thomas' book to Roger Gimbel who had a deal with EMI Television.

The project was originally developed by Roger Gimbel's production company.

Casting
At one stage, Gimbel had negotiations with Warren Beatty to play Hughes. But when these broke down the producer decided to go "180 degrees the other way" and cast an unknown. He picked Tommy Lee Jones who had appeared in films such as Jackson County Jail and who Gimbel said "matches the image the public has of Hughes". The Amazing Howard Hughes was a major break-through for Jones.

Shooting
Filming of The Amazing Howard Hughes took eight weeks. During filming, Gimbel's company was bought out by EMI Television.
A large group of aircraft were assembled for the production by Tallmantz Aviation. The aircraft included two Curtiss JN-4 biplanes, Learjet 23,  Lockheed P-38 Lightning, Lockheed Model 12 Electra Junior, North American AT-6 Texan, and Royal Aircraft Factory S.E.5.

Reception
Film historian Simon D. Beck in The Aircraft-Spotter's Film and Television Companion (2016) described  The Amazing Howard Hughes as a "... fascinating account of the life and times of eccentric millionaire, aviation pioneer and filmmaker ..." Other reviews of The Amazing Howard Hughes were, likewise, mainly positive. Part one was the fifth highest-rated show of the week; part two was the highest-rated. It was seen by over 60 million people.

Universal agreed to distribute The Amazing Howard Hughes theatrically outside the United States.

The Amazing Howard Hughes was the original release of EMI Television, an off-shoot of EMI Films.

See also
Melvin and Howard (1980)
The Aviator (2004)

References

Notes

Citations

Bibliography

 Beck, Simon D. The Aircraft-Spotter's Film and Television Companion. Jefferson, North Carolina: McFarland and Company, 2016. .

External links

allmovie synopsis; The Amazing Howard Hughes

1977 television films
1977 films
1970s biographical films
American television films
American biographical films
Cultural depictions of Howard Hughes
Cultural depictions of Katharine Hepburn
American aviation films
Biographical television films
Films set in the 1920s
Films set in the 1930s
Films set in the 1940s
Films set in the 1950s
Films set in the 1960s
Films set in the 1970s
Films directed by William Graham (director)
Films with screenplays by John Gay (screenwriter)
Films scored by Laurence Rosenthal
1970s English-language films
Biographical films about aviators
1970s American films